|}

The Meyers OTW (Out To Win) was a 1930s United States training biplane designed by Allen Meyers and built by his Meyers Aircraft Company from 1936 to 1944.

Development
In anticipation for a demand for training aircraft caused by the introduction of a civilian war training scheme (in which civil flying schools would provide primary training for the military), Allen Meyers designed the OTW and formed the Meyers Aircraft Company to build it. The OTW was a conventional biplane with tandem seating for two in open cockpits and a fixed tailwheel landing gear.  The prototype was powered by a 125 hp (93 kW) Warner Scarab engine and it first flew on 10 May 1936. The aircraft was produced in two main variants; the OTW-145 powered by a 145 hp (108 kW) Warner Super Scarab, and the OTW-160 powered by a 160 hp (119 kW) Kinner R-5 engine.

Variants
OTW-125
Production variant with 125hp (93kW) Warner Scarab engine.
OTW-145
Production variant with 145hp (108kW) Warner Super Scarab engine.
OTW-160
Final production variant with 160hp (119kW) Kinner R-5 engine.
OTW-KR
One aircraft was re-engined with a 120hp (89kW) Ken-Royce 7G engine.

Surviving aircraft

 1 – On static display at the Combat Air Museum in Topeka, Kansas. It was acquired by the museum in late 1986.
 2- Airworthy and located at Sutter County, CA (O52)
 45 – Airworthy with James Kieran Padden in Longhirst, Northumberland.
 53 – Airworthy at the Pioneer Flight Museum in Kingsbury, Texas.
 57 – Airworthy with Theodore K. Heckman in Allegan, Michigan.
 102 – On static display at the EAA Aviation Museum in Oshkosh, Wisconsin. It was the last OTW built and was assembled from parts to be the personal aircraft of Allen Meyers.

Specifications (OTW-160)

See also

References

Further reading

External links

 Aerofiles
 "Original OTW built by Allen Meyers on display at Combat Air Museum"

1930s United States civil trainer aircraft
OTW
Single-engined tractor aircraft
Biplanes
Aircraft first flown in 1936